Senji-ye Olya (also Romanized as Senjī-ye ‘Olyā; also known as Senjī and Sanjī) is a village in Arabkhaneh Rural District, Shusef District, Nehbandan County, South Khorasan Province, Iran. At the 2006 census, its population was 62, in 20 families.

References 

Populated places in Nehbandan County